Cavillator is a monotypic genus of Zimbabwean jumping spiders containing the single species, Cavillator longipes. It was first described by Wanda Wesołowska in 2000, and is only found in Zimbabwe.

References

Arthropods of Zimbabwe
Monotypic Salticidae genera
Salticidae
Spiders of Africa
Taxa named by Wanda Weso%C5%82owska
Taxa named by Wanda Wesołowska